Rock Ferry (previously Bebington and Mersey, 1973 to 1979, and Tranmere, 1979 to 2004) is a Wirral Metropolitan Borough Council ward in the Birkenhead Parliamentary constituency.

Councillors

References

Wards of Merseyside
Birkenhead
Politics of the Metropolitan Borough of Wirral
Wards of the Metropolitan Borough of Wirral